John Lowe (born 1900; date of death unknown) was an English footballer who played on the right-wing for Ripley Town, Sheffield Wednesday, Chesterfield, Bolton Wanderers, Port Vale, Oldham Athletic, and Rotherham United.

Career
Lowe played for Ripley Town and Sheffield Wednesday, before he joined Chesterfield. He made his debut for the club playing at number seven on 4 September 1920, in a 0–0 draw with Grimsby Town Reserves. He scored his first goal nine days later in a 1–1 draw with Leeds United Reserves. He scored five goals in 33 Midland Football League games in the 1920–21 season, and also played in the Chesterfield Hospital Charity Cup final victory over Staveley Town. He then moved into the First Division with Bolton Wanderers, before joining Port Vale in May 1923. He scored twice in 32 appearances in the 1923–24 campaign. He became an ever-present during the 1924–25 (45 games) and 1925–26 (43 games) seasons, making 128 consecutive appearances between April 1924 and March 1927, as Vale posted two consecutive eighth-place finishes in the Second Division. His run came to the end as he sprained an ankle, though he did score eight goals in 45 games as the "Valiants" finished eighth for a third consecutive time in 1926–27. He lost his first team place in September 1927 and featured just nine times in the 1927–28 season, before he was handed a free transfer in May 1928. He went on to play for Oldham Athletic and Rotherham United – he made just the one appearance for the "Millers", in a 2–1 Third Division North win over Rochdale at Spotland on 21 September 1929 – before returning to his hometown club Ripley, where he ultimately became a committee member.

Career statistics

Honours
Chesterfield
Chesterfield Hospital Charity Cup: 1920

References

People from Ripley, Derbyshire
Footballers from Derbyshire
English footballers
Association football midfielders
Sheffield Wednesday F.C. players
Chesterfield F.C. players
Bolton Wanderers F.C. players
Port Vale F.C. players
Oldham Athletic A.F.C. players
Rotherham United F.C. players
Ripley Town F.C. players
Midland Football League players
English Football League players
1900 births
Year of death missing